Stephen John Doughty (born 15 April 1980) is a Welsh Labour and Co-operative Party politician who has served as the Member of Parliament (MP) for Cardiff South and Penarth since 2012. He has been the Shadow Minister for Africa and a Shadow Minister for International Development since 2020.

Early life
Doughty was born in Cardiff before his family moved to the Vale of Glamorgan. After attending Llantwit Major Comprehensive School, he studied at Lester B. Pearson United World College of the Pacific in Canada (when he served as a member of British Columbia Youth Parliament), at Corpus Christi College, Oxford University (from which he graduated with an upper second-class degree in Philosophy, Politics and Economics), and at the University of St Andrews. While at Oxford, he was a member of an all-male singing group Out of the Blue.

Early career
After time spent working in Denmark, Doughty returned to the UK, where he became an advisor to Labour MP Douglas Alexander. He then worked in various roles for Oxfam International, before becoming the head of Oxfam Cymru in 2011.

From 2004 to 2009 Doughty was a trustee of the British section of United World Colleges.

In March 2010, prior to the May 2010 General Election, the BBC's political correspondent David Cornock reported  that Doughty was one of the candidates on Labour's shortlist for the Pontypridd parliamentary constituency. The other candidates on the short-list were Jayne Brencher, Delyth Evans, Bethan Roberts, and Owen Smith—who was selected and who subsequently retained the seat for Labour at the general election.

Doughty and his father had been long-time family friends of Cardiff South and Penarth Labour MP Alun Michael. Michael said "Stephen Doughty’s father and I first met 40 years ago when I was a youth worker and he was involved with an Army youth group. I have known Stephen since he was a baby". When Alun Michael announced his decision to step down as Cardiff South and Penarth MP in order to stand for election as South Wales Police and Crime Commissioner, the Western Mail reported on 13 July 2012 that Michael had been "interfering inappropriately" in Labour's selection process for his putative successor in the constituency in order to ensure his preferred candidate (Stephen Doughty) was included on the shortlist. Michael subsequently admitted that he had indeed spoken personally to Labour leader Ed Miliband, to the party's general secretary Iain McNicol and to members of the National Executive Committee, with the purpose of "preventing a stitch-up" and "stopping a candidate from outside being imposed on the local party". After Michael's intervention Doughty's name was included in the final short list along with four other candidates, Kate Groucutt, Karen Wilkie, Nick Thomas-Symonds and Jeremy Miles. Doughty was selected in a vote by constituency Labour Party members on 14 July 2012.

Parliamentary career

In the parliamentary by-election on 15 November 2012, Doughty was voted in as the Labour MP for Cardiff South and Penarth. He took the seat with a majority of 5,334, taking 47.3% of the vote. This enhanced Labour's majority in the area, which previously stood at 4,709.

Doughty made his maiden speech in the House of Commons on 28 November 2012.

In January 2013, Doughty was appointed to the Labour Shadow Treasury team as an aide to Rachel Reeves, the Shadow Chief Secretary to the Treasury.

Following Iain Wright's election as the Business, Innovation and Skills (BIS) Select Committee chair, Doughty succeed him in the Shadow BIS team as the Shadow Minister for Trade and Industry in a June 2015 mini-reshuffle.

In October 2015, he was moved to a position as a Shadow Foreign Office Minister with responsibility for Africa, South Asia and International Organisations, under Shadow Foreign Secretary Hilary Benn.

In December 2015 Doughty supported air strikes against Syria, a decision for which he was criticised by many of his constituents and political activists via social media. He called the police to deal with the 'personal threats' he had received.

He supported Owen Smith in the failed attempt to replace Jeremy Corbyn in the 2016 Labour Party leadership election.

Doughty endorsed Keir Starmer in the 2020 Labour Party leadership election.

Starmer appointed Doughty Shadow Minister for the Foreign and Commonwealth Office and Department for International Development, responsible for Africa and international development.

In May 2021, Doughty apologised for asking a constituent to provide him with diazepam, a Class C controlled drug without a prescription, for anxiety ahead of a flight in 2019. South Wales Police did not take further action because they determined that the allegation he possessed a controlled substance "cannot be proved in these circumstances". The Parliamentary Commissioner for Standards ruled in October 2021 that he had not broken the MPs' code of conduct. The constituent who was cautioned for supplying the diazepam complained to the Independent Office for Police Conduct who asked South Wales Police to re-examine the case in May 2022. They announced in December 2022 that they stood by their original decision.

Resignation
In January 2016, Doughty announced that he had resigned as a shadow Foreign Minister on the live Daily Politics programme, saying that he supported the sacked Pat McFadden's views on terrorism and accusing members of the Labour leadership team of lying about the reasons for McFadden's sacking. According to McFadden he was sacked for comments in the debate on the Paris bombings which condemned "the view that sees terrorist acts as always being a response or a reaction to what we in the west do".

Doughty's appearance on the Daily Politics became contentious after it emerged that Laura Kuenssberg, the BBC's political editor, had arranged for Doughty to make his public announcement on the programme just before Prime Minister's Questions. According to Labour's spokesman, it was an "unacceptable breach of the BBC's role and statutory obligations. By the BBC's own account, BBC journalists and presenters proposed and secured the resignation of a shadow minister on air ... apparently to ensure maximum news and political impact."  The Labour Party's Director of Communications Seumas Milne made a formal complaint to the BBC. "Neither the programme production team, nor Laura, played any part in his decision to resign", Robbie Gibb, the BBC head of live political programmes wrote to Milne. "As you know it is a long standing tradition that political programmes on the BBC, along with all other news outlets, seek to break stories. It is true that we seek to make maximum impact with our journalism which is entirely consistent with the BBC’s editorial guidelines and values." Doughty said on Twitter that he had resigned "shortly before I did the interview so there was not time for spin doctors to start smearing me".

Personal life
Doughty lives in the Splott area of Cardiff. He has been a Cub and Scout leader since 2004, and is a Cardiff City season ticket holder. He features in the  List of leading Welsh LGBT figures. Doughty is a Christian.

Notes

References

External links
Official website

Living people
People from Llandaff
Welsh Labour Party MPs
Labour Co-operative MPs for Welsh constituencies
Oxfam people
British special advisers
LGBT members of the Parliament of the United Kingdom
Members of the Parliament of the United Kingdom for Cardiff constituencies
1980 births
UK MPs 2010–2015
UK MPs 2015–2017
UK MPs 2017–2019
UK MPs 2019–present
Alumni of Corpus Christi College, Oxford
Alumni of the University of St Andrews
Politicians from Cardiff
Welsh LGBT politicians
Gay politicians
People educated at a United World College